EF Education–Nippo Development Team is a UCI Continental cycling team registered in United States, as a development team of .

It was previously known as Nippo–Provence–PTS Conti, a Swiss UCI Continental team, founded in November 2020, that commenced racing from the 2021 season.

Team roster

Major wins
2022
Stage 3 Tour of Japan, Atsushi Oka
 Under-23 Time Trial Championships, Yuhi Todome
 Overall Tour de Hokkaido, Yusuke Kadota

References

External links

UCI Continental Teams (America)
Cycling teams established in 2020
Cycling teams based in the United States